District 5, 5 District or 5th District may refer to:

Europe
 District 5 (Zürich)
 District 5, Düsseldorf
 V District, Turku
 District 5, an electoral district of Malta
 District 5, a police district of Malta
 Palma-Palmilla, also known as District 5, a district of Málaga, Spain

Asia

Japan
 Aichi 5th district
 Hokkaido 5th district
 Kyoto 5th district
 Gunma 5th district

Other places
 District 5, Ho Chi Minh City
 5th District of Manila

Middle East
 Kuwait's Fifth District

Oceania
 5th Military District (Australia)

North America

United States
 5th Military District
 5th Naval District
 Lexington & Richland County School District Five
 Egyptian Community Unit School District 5
 School District 5 Southeast Kootenay

Judicial districts
 5th District Appellate Court
 Florida Fifth District Court of Appeal

US local districts
 Los Angeles City Council District 5

US federal congressional districts
 Alabama's 5th congressional district
 Arkansas's 5th congressional district
 Arizona's 5th congressional district
 California's 5th congressional district
 Colorado's 5th congressional district
 Connecticut's 5th congressional district
 Florida's 5th congressional district
 Georgia's 5th congressional district
 Illinois's 5th congressional district
 Indiana's 5th congressional district
 Iowa's 5th congressional district
 Kansas's 5th congressional district
 Kentucky's 5th congressional district
 Louisiana's 5th congressional district
 Maine's 5th congressional district
 Maryland's 5th congressional district
 Massachusetts's 5th congressional district
 Michigan's 5th congressional district
 Minnesota's 5th congressional district
 Mississippi's 5th congressional district
 Missouri's 5th congressional district
 Nebraska's 5th congressional district
 New Jersey's 5th congressional district
 New York's 5th congressional district
 North Carolina's 5th congressional district
 Ohio's 5th congressional district
 Oklahoma's 5th congressional district
 Oregon's 5th congressional district
 Pennsylvania's 5th congressional district
 South Carolina's 5th congressional district
 Tennessee's 5th congressional district
 Texas's 5th congressional district
 Vermont's 5th congressional district
 Virginia's 5th congressional district
 Washington's 5th congressional district
 West Virginia's 5th congressional district
 Wisconsin's 5th congressional district

US state senates
 California's 5th State Senate district
 Pennsylvania Senate, District 5
 Texas Senate, District 5
 5th Utah Senate District
 Wisconsin Senate, District 5

US state houses
 California's 5th State Assembly district
 Connecticut's 5th assembly district
 New Hampshire's 5th State Senate District
 Pennsylvania House of Representatives, District 5

Fiction
District 5 (Hunger Games), fictional district in the Hunger Games books and films

See also
Sector 5 (Bucharest)
District 4 (disambiguation)
District 6 (disambiguation)